Father Xmas is a 2001 short film from director Marie Rose and the American Film Institute's Directing Workshop for Women starring Dakota Fanning in debut as six-year-old Clairee who learns from her older brother (Stephen Fanning) that Santa Claus is not real and that their father is fighting in the Vietnam War.

External links
 
 
 Double Dog Music website (offers download of the film)

2001 short films
2001 films
American short films
Vietnam War films
2000s English-language films